= Dhakkiwala Mohra =

- Town
- Location within Pakistan
- Coordinates: 33.23°N 73.16°E
- Country: Pakistan
- Province: Islamabad C.T
- Elevation: 531 m (1,742 ft)
- Time zone: UTC+5 (PST)

Dhakkiwala Mohra is a town in the Islamabad Capital Territory of Pakistan. It is located at 33° 24' 45N 73° 17' 20E with an altitude of 531 metres (1745 feet).
